Iran competed at the 2014 Winter Olympics in Sochi, Russia from 7 to 23 February 2014. Iran's team consisted of five athletes in two sports, representing the largest ever Iranian team at the Winter Olympics.

Alpine skiing 

According to the final quota allocation released on January 20, 2014, Iran had three athletes in qualification position.

Cross-country skiing 

According to the final quota allocation released on January 20, 2014 Iran had two athletes in qualification position. For the first time ever Iran also qualified a female cross-country skier.

Distance

See also
Iran at the 2014 Summer Youth Olympics
Iran at the 2014 Winter Paralympics

References

External links 
 
 

Nations at the 2014 Winter Olympics
2014
2014 in Iranian sport